Bernard Louis Zehrfuss (Angers, 20 October 1911 – Neuilly-sur-Seine, 3 July 1996) was a French architect.

Life
He was born at Angers, into a family that had fled from the Alsace in 1870 after the Franco-Prussian War.

Zehrfuss's father was killed in the First Battle of the Marne in 1914. He attended the École des Beaux-Arts in Paris from the age of 18 and won its most prestigious award, the Prix de Rome in 1939 (also the year of his first major design, for the Sébastien Charléty Stadium in Paris), though the outbreak of the Second World War prevented him from taking up his stay at the Villa Medici in Rome. After a short stay in Nice, he became an assistant in Eugene Beaudouin's Marseilles workshop, then founded a short-lived artistic commune in nearby Oppède, a commune that attracted French sculptor François Stahly and the writer and artist Consuelo de Saint Exupéry.  Zehrfuss then obtained a visa for Spain and joined the Free French Forces.

In French-controlled Algeria and Tunisia from 1943 through 1953, Zehrfuss was appointed to office in the Directorate of Public Works and built many well-received housing projects, schools and hospitals.

On return to France he was made Chief Architect of Public Buildings and National Palaces and participated in two high-profile projects:  the 1953 European headquarters of UNESCO, a collaboration with Marcel Breuer and Pier Luigi Nervi, and the 1958 Center of New Industries and Technologies, one of the first buildings of La Défense.  These stand among many French housing projects and embassies through the 1960s and 1970s.

In 1975 he designed the new building for the Gallo-Roman Museum of Lyon. In 1983, Zehrfuss was elected a member of the Academy of Fine Arts, where he became the perpetual secretary in 1994, succeeding Marcel Landowski.

He died at Neuilly-sur-Seine in 1996.

Main works

 1939 : Stade Charlety in Paris (rebuilt in 1994 by Henri and Bruno Gaudin)
 1950-1953 : Mame printworks in Tours in collaboration with Jean Prouvé
 1950-1958 : Flins Renault Factory and the "cité Flins" nearby
 1952-1958 : UNESCO HQ in Paris in association with Marcel Breuer and Pier Luigi Nervi, then its extension (1965–1978)
 1954-1958 : the CNIT at la Défense in association with Robert Camelot and Jean de Mailly
 1959-1963 : Haut-du-Lièvre overlooking Nancy
 1960 : Clichy-sous-Bois-Montfermeil
 1960-1963 : Faculty of Sciences of the University of Tunis
 1962-1967 : flats (5 towers with 15 floors - 370 housing units) 120-126 avenue Jean-Jaurès in Pantin
 1962-1970 : French embassy in Warsaw in collaboration with Henry Bernard and Guillaume Gillet (fully renovated by Jean-Philippe Pargade in 2004)
 1967 : Garonor in Aulnay-sous-Bois
 1968 : Sandoz-France's HQ at Rueil-Malmaison
 1970 : Danish Embassy in Paris
 1972 : Siemens-France's HQ in Plaine-Saint-Denis
 1972-1975 : Gallo-Roman Museum of Lyon
 1973 : Tour Anjou at la Défense, commune of Puteaux
 1976 : Jeumont-Schneider's HQ in Puteaux
 1976 : flats on the "Procession" and "Falguière" islets in the 15th arrondissement of Paris (12000 and 387 housing units)

References

Bibliography 
 Bernard Zehrfuss, De l'architecture, Des villes, Institut de France, 1994–1995
 François Chaslin, "Bernard Zehrfuss", Dictionnaire des architectes, éd. Encyclopaedia Universalis - Albin Michel, 1999, pp. 742–744
 Christine Desmoulin, Bernard Zehrfuss (1911-1996): itinéraire d'un architecte, mémoire de DEA d'histoire socio-culturelle, ed. François Loyer, Université de Versailles-Saint-Quentin-en-Yvelines, 2001
Christine Desmoulins : Bernard Zehrfuss, un architecture français (1911–1996). Une figure des Trente Glorieuses, doctoral thesis, ed. François Loyer, Spécialité : Histoire de l'Architecture, Laboratoire : LADRHAUS,École Nationale Supérieure d'Architecture de Versailles, 2008.

1911 births
1996 deaths
People from Angers
20th-century French architects
Prix de Rome for architecture
École des Beaux-Arts alumni
Members of the Académie des beaux-arts
Commandeurs of the Ordre des Arts et des Lettres